The 2017 IBSF Junior Bobsleigh World Championships took place at the Winterberg bobsleigh, luge, and skeleton track in Winterberg, Germany, from 27 to 29 January 2017.

Schedule
Three events were held.

All times are local (UTC+1).

Bobsleigh

References

2017 IBSF Junior Bobsleigh World Championships
2017 IBSF Junior Bobsleigh World Championships
2017 IBSF Junior Bobsleigh World Championships
Bobsleigh in Germany
January 2017 sports events in Europe